Albert Vyacheslavovich Fedosov (born 4 September 1970) is a former Russian football player.

References

1970 births
Living people
Soviet footballers
FC Mordovia Saransk players
Russian footballers
FC Fakel Voronezh players
FC Chernomorets Novorossiysk players
Russian Premier League players
FC Elista players
FC Lokomotiv Nizhny Novgorod players
FC Dynamo Bryansk players
FC Kristall Smolensk players
Association football midfielders
FC Avangard Kursk players